There were two Governments of the 16th Dáil, which was elected at the general election held on 5 March 1957. The outgoing minority coalition government of Fine Gael, the Labour Party and Clann na Talmhan had failed to be returned. The 8th Government of Ireland (20 March 1957 – 23 June 1959) was led by Éamon de Valera as Taoiseach, and the 9th Government of Ireland (23 June 1959 – 11 November 1961) was led by Seán Lemass as Taoiseach. Both were single-party Fianna Fáil governments.

The 9th Government lasted for  days.

8th Government of Ireland

Nomination of Taoiseach
The members of the 16th Dáil first met on 20 March 1957. In the debate on the nomination of Taoiseach, Fianna Fáil leader Éamon de Valera was proposed and this motion was carried with 78 votes in favour and 53 votes against. De Valera was appointed as Taoiseach by President Seán T. O'Kelly.

Members of the Government
After his appointment as Taoiseach by the president, Éamon de Valera proposed the members of the government and they were approved by the Dáil. They were appointed by the president on the same day.

Parliamentary Secretaries
On 21 March 1957, the Government appointed the Parliamentary Secretaries on the nomination of the Taoiseach.

Constitutional referendum
The government proposed the Third Amendment of the Constitution Bill 1958, which would have altered the electoral system from proportional representation by means of the single transferable vote to first past the post. It was put to a referendum on 17 June 1959, the same date as the presidential election. It was defeated by a margin of 48.2% to 51.8% of votes cast.

Confidence in the government
On 29 October 1958, William Norton, leader of the Labour Party, tabled a vote of no confidence in the government. James Dillon and Liam Cosgrave proposed an amendment to the motion. Both the amendment and the motion were defeated the following day on a vote of 54 to 71.

Resignation
On 17 June 1959, Éamon de Valera was elected as president of Ireland and he resigned as Taoiseach on that day. Under Article 28.11 of the Constitution, all members of the government are deemed to have resigned on the resignation of the Taoiseach, but they continued to carry on their duties until the appointment of their successors.

9th Government of Ireland

Éamon de Valera resigned as leader of Fianna Fáil after his election as president of Ireland and Seán Lemass was elected unopposed to succeed him on 22 June 1959.

Nomination of Taoiseach
On 23 June 1959, in the debate on the nomination of Taoiseach, Fianna Fáil leader Seán Lemass was proposed. This motion was carried with 75 votes in favour to 51 votes against. Lemass was appointed as Taoiseach by President Seán T. O'Kelly. It was the first time there was a change of Taoiseach within a Dáil term.

Members of the Government
After his appointment as Taoiseach by the president, Seán Lemass proposed the members of the government and they were approved by the Dáil. They were appointed by the president on 24 June 1959.

Parliamentary Secretaries
On 24 June 1959, the government appointed the Parliamentary Secretaries on the nomination of the Taoiseach.

See also
Dáil Éireann
Constitution of Ireland
Politics of the Republic of Ireland

References

Governments of Ireland
1957 establishments in Ireland
1961 disestablishments in Ireland
Cabinets established in 1957
Cabinets established in 1961
16th Dáil